Fred Ulysse (c. 1934 – 24 October 2020) was a French actor. He was known for his role of Martin Féral, brother of Jacquou le Croquant in the television series Jacquou le Croquant, based on the novel of the same name by Eugène Le Roy.

Filmography

Cinema
Cause toujours, mon lapin (1961)
Mais toi, tu es Pierre (1973)
Raging Fists (1975)
I Am Pierre Riviere (1976)
Le Mors aux dents (1979)
Moon in the Gutter (1983)
Tout le monde peut se tromper (1983)
Rouget le braconnier (1989)
Germinal (1993)
Le Péril jeune (1994)
To Matthieu (2000)
Vidocq (2001)
Son frère (2003)
L'Ennemi naturel (2004)
13 Tzameti (2005)
Les Poings serrés (2005)
Nos retrouvailles (2007)
Rivals (2008)
Making Plans for Lena (2009)
My Piece of the Pie (2011)
Les Yeux de sa mère (2011)
La Traque (2011)
L'Odeur de la mandarine (2015)
The House by the Sea (2017)
Persona non grata (2019)
Only the Animals (2019)

Television
La Princesse du rail (1967)
Jacquou le Croquant (1969)
Que ferait donc Faber ? (1969)
Les Cinq Dernières Minutes (1972)
Sans Famille (1981)
Messieurs les jurés (1986)
Intrigues (1990)
L'Instit (1998)
L'Été rouge (2002)
Le Père Amable (2007)
L'Homme de la berge (2010)
Rituels meutrieurs (2011)
Intime Conviction (2014)
Au revoir... et à bientôt ! (2015)

References

1930s births
2020 deaths
20th-century French actors
21st-century French actors
French male film actors
French male television actors